Karl Steinhuber (1 May 1906 in Linz – November 2002) was an Austrian sprint canoeist who competed in the late 1930s. He won a silver medal in the K-2 10000 m event at the 1936 Summer Olympics in Berlin.

References

Karl Steinhuber's profile at databaseOlympics
Karl Steinhuber's profile at Sports Reference.com
Biography of Karl Steinhuber 

1906 births
2002 deaths
Austrian male canoeists
Canoeists at the 1936 Summer Olympics
Olympic canoeists of Austria
Olympic silver medalists for Austria
Olympic medalists in canoeing
Medalists at the 1936 Summer Olympics
Sportspeople from Linz